Carl Francis Schueler (born February 26, 1956, in Newburyport, Massachusetts) is a retired male race walker from the United States. Schueler was a four time olympian and  the first American to walk the 50k under 4 hours.

Olympics
Schueler qualified for the 1980 U.S. Olympic team but was unable to compete due to the 1980 Summer Olympics boycott. He did however receive one of 461 Congressional Gold Medals created especially for the spurned athletes. He was a four time Olympian (1980–1992) and competed in three consecutive Summer Olympics during his career.

Personal life
He has two daughters named Ellie and Margy, and is married to Debora VanOrden, a twice first alternate Olympic team racewalker. Schueler lives in Colorado Springs, CO.

Personal bests
 20 km: 1:25:04 hrs – 1986
 50 km: 3:57:09 hrs –  Rome, 5 September 1987

Achievements

While living in Bethesda, Maryland, Schueler assisted in founding Potomac Valley Track Club, and its annual race walker of the year award is named after him in commemoration for the work he did for them.

References

External links
 
 

1956 births
Living people
American male racewalkers
Pan American Games track and field athletes for the United States
Athletes (track and field) at the 1987 Pan American Games
Olympic track and field athletes of the United States
Athletes (track and field) at the 1984 Summer Olympics
Athletes (track and field) at the 1988 Summer Olympics
Athletes (track and field) at the 1992 Summer Olympics
Congressional Gold Medal recipients